
Year 277 BC was a year of the pre-Julian Roman calendar. At the time it was known as the Year of the Consulship of Rufinus and Brutus (or, less frequently, year 477 Ab urbe condita). The denomination 277 BC for this year has been used since the early medieval period, when the Anno Domini calendar era became the prevalent method in Europe for naming years.

Events 
 By place 
 Greece 
 Antigonus crosses the Hellespont and defeats the Celts under the command of Cerethrius at the Battle of Lysimachia near Lysimachia at the neck of the Thracian Chersonese. After this success, he is acknowledged by the Macedonians as their king.

 Sicily 
 Pyrrhus captures Eryx, the strongest Carthaginian fortress in Sicily. This prompts the rest of the Carthaginian-controlled cities in Sicily to defect to Pyrrhus.

Births 
 Fan Zeng, Chinese adviser during the Chu-Han Contention (d. 204 BC)

Deaths 
 Sosthenes, Macedonian general and king of the Antipatrid Dynasty

References